Little Hope may refer to:

Little Hope, Alabama, an unincorporated community
Little Hope, Pennsylvania, an unincorporated community
Little Hope, Wisconsin, an unincorporated community
 The Dark Pictures Anthology: Little Hope, a 2020 survival horror video game

See also
Little Hope River